Paropta is a genus of moths in the family Cossidae.

Species
 Paropta paradoxus Herrich-Schäffer, 1851

Former species
 Paropta confusa Rothschild, 1912
 Paropta frater (Warnecke, 1929)
 Paropta henleyi Warren & Rothschild, 1905
 Paropta johannes Staudinger, 1899
 Paropta l-nigrum Bethune-Baker, 1894

References

Natural History Museum Lepidoptera generic names catalog

Cossinae